Epimactis strombodes is a moth in the family Lecithoceridae. It was described by Edward Meyrick in 1914. It is found in Sri Lanka.

The wingspan is about 17 mm for males and 24 mm for females. The forewings are whitish yellow and the hindwings are yellow whitish.

References

Moths described in 1914
Epimactis
Taxa named by Edward Meyrick